Graham Lake in Hancock County, Maine is a eutrophic reservoir formed by the construction of a hydro-electric power dam in 1922 four miles (6 km) upstream from Ellsworth, Maine.  The first dam was a hastily built earthen dam built by the Bangor Hydro Electric Company.  It failed in 1923, flooding downtown Ellsworth and doing almost $8 million in property damage.  The dam was rebuilt and operated by Bangor Hydro until its sale in 1999.  The dam has since been acquired by PPL Corporation, which continues to use it to generate electricity.

Water clarity in the lake is low, with secchi disk measurements averaging less than 3 meters.  Fish in the lake that are of interest to anglers include smallmouth bass, white perch, chain pickerel, landlocked salmon, and brook trout.

References

External links

Reservoirs in Maine
Lakes of Hancock County, Maine